Astana Football Club is a professional football club based in Astana. They play in the Kazakhstan Premier League, the highest level of Kazakh football. The club's home ground is the 30,254-seat Astana Arena stadium. The club colours, reflected in their badge and kit, are sky blue and yellow. Founded as Lokomotiv Astana in 2009, the club changed its name to Astana in 2011. They are members of the Astana Presidential Club, an association of the main sports teams in the capital supported by the Sovereign Wealth Fund Samruk-Kazyna.

The short history of the club already boasts seven league titles, three Kazakhstan Cups and five Kazakhstan Super Cups.

History

Founding and first years (2009–2014) 

On 27 December 2008, football clubs from Almaty Megasport and Alma-Ata announced they would merge to found a new club. The club was named "FC Lokomotiv Astana" as the National Railway Company Kazakhstan Temir Zholy became a general sponsor. Kazakhstan Temir Zholy in cooperation with City Council of Astana decided to move the club to the new building stadium in the capital of Kazakhstan. Vakhid Masudov became the first head coach in the club's history. The club has benefited from a high salary role which has enabled them to attract players of status to the club. Andrey Tikhonov and Yegor Titov first of all came from the Russian Football Premier League. Several more followed such as Patrick Ovie and Baffour Gyan. Maksim Shatskikh later arrived from Dynamo Kyiv in the Ukrainian Premier League which was again a very high-profile capture for the club. The majority of their other players have arrived from other clubs of the Kazakhstan Premier League, mostly on free transfers from the clubs which were absorbed to make the club and several which went into bankruptcy.

On 8 March 2009, Lokomotiv played in the league's inaugural match against Kazakhmys in Satbayev. In March 2009, Vakhid Masudov was replaced by Vladimir Gulyamkhaidarov. However, only two days after his appointment he was replaced by Russian specialist Sergei Yuran. The club earned silver medals in their first season of play. On 14 November 2010, Holger Fach guided Astana to their first Kazakhstan Cup success. However, they were ineligible for a UEFA license since they had not yet existed for at least three years. So they were not able to start in the 2011–12 UEFA Europa League. On 2 March 2011, Astana beat Tobol 2–1 and won the Kazakhstan Super Cup for the first time. In 2012, Miroslav Beránek led Astana to win their second Kazakhstan Cup. In July 2013, the club made a debut in Europe playing in the first qualifying round of the UEFA Europa League against Botev Plovdiv. Astana lost both matches, 0–1 at home and 0–5 away. On 4 July 2013, Astana officially joined to newly created Astana Presidential Sports Club, the organization supported by the Sovereign Wealth Fund Samruk-Kazyna to combine the main sports teams in Astana.

Stoilov years: Domestic dominance and European breakthrough (2014–2018) 

On 22 June 2014, the club announced that former Botev Plovdiv manager Stanimir Stoilov was appointed as new head coach. In 2014–15 European campaign, Astana played four ties in the UEFA Europa League qualifying stages. In the first round they beat Pyunik 6–1 on aggregate, then raised more than a few eyebrows in the second round, beating Hapoel Tel Aviv 3–1 on aggregate thanks to a convincing home leg win. The third qualifying round saw Astana cruise past AIK, with a 4–1 aggregate score. In the play-off round, Astana was defeated by Villarreal. On 1 November 2014, Astana became Kazakhstan Premier League champions for the first time in their history, securing the championship with a 3–0 home win against Kaisar.

On 1 March 2015, Astana won the 2015 Kazakhstan Super Cup, beating Kairat 3–2 in a penalty shoot-out after the match ended with the score 0–0. On 26 August 2015, the club became the first team from Kazakhstan to reach the group stage of the UEFA Champions League, after beating APOEL 2–1 on aggregate in the play-off round. They were drawn in Group C alongside Benfica, Atlético Madrid and Galatasaray, where they managed to obtain four points in six games after four draws and two losses. On 8 November 2015, Astana clinched their second Kazakhstan Premier League title beating Aktobe 1–0 at home in the last tour game. On 9 December 2015, the club extended their contract with Stanimir Stoilov for the next two years.

In the 2016 season, Astana was eliminated from UEFA Champions League after two stages, being defeated by Celtic in the third qualifying round 3–2 on aggregate. However, the club qualified for the UEFA Europa League group stage, beating BATE in the play-off round. On 26 October 2016, Astana won their third straight championship under Stoilov's rule. On 19 November 2016, the club won the 2016 Kazakhstan Cup, defeating Kairat 1–0. Their 2017 Champions League bid was stopped short once again by Celtic, this time in the playoff round. Following an embarrassing 5–0 rout in Glasgow, they failed to reach the group stages in an 8–4 defeat on aggregate. However, Astana reached another milestone by reaching the knockout phase of the 2017–18 UEFA Europa League after finishing second in the group phase. Astana extended further its domestic dominance by winning fourth consecutive title in the 2017 season. On 8 January 2018, Stoilov signed a new contract with Astana, but left the club on 1 March 2018 to take over the vacant Kazakhstan national football team's manager position.

Post Stoilov years: (2018–) 
On the same day as Stoilov was announced as the new manager of Kazakhstan, 1 March 2018, Grigori Babayan was announced as the Astana's interim manager. On 1 June 2018, Astana announced Roman Hryhorchuk as the club's new manager. On 17 August 2018, Hryhorchuk left Astana on compassionate leave with Grigori Babayan again stepping in as Caretaker Manager. Astana announced on 3 January 2019 that Hryhorchuk would return to lead the team after missing the second half of the 2018 season due to family reasons.
On 14 January 2019, Paul Ashworth was announced as the new executive director of FC Astana.
Hryhorchuk left Astana by mutual consent on 13 January 2020. The following day, 14 January 2020, Michal Bílek was announced as the new head coach of Astana.

On 18 February 2020, Astana revealed a new logo to commemorate 10-years of the club.

On 26 August 2020, with Astana 2nd in the league and having just being knocked out of the UEFA Champions League, Michal Bílek was sacked as manager, with Executive Director Paul Ashworth taking over in a caretaker capacity. Ashworth his role as caretaker manager and Executive Director by mutual consent on 7 October 2020. Two days later, 9 October, David Loria was announced as the clubs new Executive Director. On 16 October 2020, former captain Andrey Tikhonov was appointed as the clubs new manager.

On 5 November 2021, Astana announced the departure of Andrey Tikhonov as their manager, with Srđan Blagojević being announced as the clubs new head coach on 21 November 2021. On 13 September 2022, Blagojević left Astana by mutual consent to become Head Coach of Debreceni, with Grigori Babayan returning to the club as their new Head Coach.

Stadium 

Astana's current home venue is Astana Arena. The stadium has been Astana's home since the mid of the 2009 season, when the club moved from the Kazhymukan Munaitpasov Stadium. The stadium holds 30,254 and has a retractable roof. The inaugural match at the new stadium was a 2–1 win over the Kazakhstan national under-21 football team in a friendly match. It is also serves as a national stadium for the Kazakhstan national football team.

Colours and crest 

The team's original crest was implemented in 2009 consisting of the team's name, Football Club Lokomotiv Astana, on a blue round frame and a blue coloured letter "L" in the center, meaning railway track. As the result of renaming in 2011, the club adopted a new crest. The crest consisted of the team's name with uppercase letters on an image of the ball. This was accompanied by the words "football club" in Kazakh and Russian languages on the top and bottom of the crest. On 23 January 2013, the club presented a new crest, which replicated the style and colours of the Lokomotiv Astana crest. The crest consisted an image of the ball in a shanyrak style and two Kazakh national patterns on each side. The present club crest was introduced on 10 March 2014, and incorporated the Astana Presidential Club crest's style and colours as well as BC Astana, Astana Pro Team and Astana Dakar Team. The crest consists of the team's name, Astana Football Club, under a flying ball.

Blue and white were initially the club's primary colours, the team's nickname was the "Blue-and-White". Blue was used to accent the home jersey while white was the main colour of the team's away kit. During the 2012 season, Astana wore yellow and blue striped shirts and blue shorts as home kit and wholly blue away kit. In 2013, they retrieved original colours used from 2009 to 2011. In 2013, the club joined to Astana Presidential Club and adopted its colours. The present club colours are sky blue and yellow. Astana's current shirt sponsor is Sovereign Wealth Fund Samruk-Kazyna. The club's first kit sponsorship was from national railway company Kazakhstan Temir Zholy who sponsored the club for a total of 4 years before ending the deal in 2013. The team's kit supplier is Adidas who have supplied the club kits since their inception.

In March 2023, Astana announced Chery as their new sponsor, whilst also confirming their switch to Nike.

Players

First team squad

Out on loan 

For recent transfers, see List of Kazakhstan football transfers winter 2022–23.

Retired numbers

Non-playing staff

Management

Coaching staff

Notable managers

The following managers won at least one trophy when in charge of Astana:

Honours 

Kazakhstan Premier League
Winners (7): 2014, 2015, 2016, 2017, 2018, 2019, 2022
Runners-up:(3) 2009, 2013, 2021 

Kazakhstan Cup 
Winners (3): 2010, 2012, 2016
Runner-up:(1) 2015
Kazakhstan Super Cup 
Winners (6): 2011, 2015, 2018, 2019, 2020, 2023
Runners-up: (4) 2013, 2016, 2017, 2021

Statistics

Seasons 

Key
Rank = Rank in the Kazakhstan Premier League; P = Played; W = Win; D = Draw; L = Loss; F = Goals for; A = Goals against; GD = Goal difference; Pts = Points; Cup = Kazakhstan Cup; CL = UEFA Champions League; EL = UEFA Europa League; ECL = UEFA Europa Conference League.
in = Still in competition; — = Not attended; 1R = 1st round; 2R = 2nd round; 3R = 3rd round; 1QR = 1st qualifying round; 2QR = 2nd qualifying round; 3QR = 3rd qualifying round; PO = Play-off round; GS = Group stage; ; R32 = Round of 32; R16 = Round of 16; QF = Quarterfinals; SF = Semifinals; F = Final.

European record 

Key
1QR = 1st qualifying round; 2QR = 2nd qualifying round; 3QR = 3rd qualifying round; PO = Play-off round; GS = Group stage; R32 = Round of 32.

UEFA coefficient 

The table shows the position of FC Astana (highlighted), based on their UEFA coefficient club ranking, and four clubs, which are closest to FC Astana's position (the two clubs with the higher coefficient and the two with the lower coefficient).

As of 23 April 2021.

Records 

As of match played 23 April 2021

Record European victory 4–0 v. Maccabi Tel Aviv (19 October 2017)
Record European defeat  6–0 v. AZ (24 October 2019)
 Record League victory – 7–0 v. Atyrau (9 September 2017)
 Record League defeat – 0–5 v. Irtysh (26 May 2011)
 Most League wins in a row – 8, 7 April 2009 – 30 April 2009
 Most League appearances – 227, Nenad Erić 2011–2020
 Most appearances overall – 318, Nenad Erić 2011–2020
 Most goals scored in a League season – 19, Junior Kabananga 2017 & Marin Tomasov 2019
 Most goals scored in a season overall – 26, Marin Tomasov 2019
 Youngest first-team player – Madi Zhakypbayev, 15 years, 11 months, 21 days
 Oldest first-team player – Andrey Tikhonov, 39 years, 9 days

Most appearances 

Players played over 50 competitive, professional matches only. Appearances as substitute (goals in parentheses) included in total.

Top goalscorers 

Competitive, professional matches only, appearances including substitutes appear in brackets.

Partnerships 

  Real Sociedad (2013–present)
On 11 November 2013 it was announced that Astana had partnered with the La Liga team Real Sociedad to cooperate in terms of exchange of skills and knowledge, organization of friendly matches, training camps for youth development and grassroots football.
  Galatasaray S.K. (2014–present)
On 29 April 2014 it was announced that Astana Presidential Club had signed a memorandum of cooperation with the Galatasaray Sports Club. The memorandum chiefly provides for cooperation between the Astana and Galatasaray S.K. football departments.

References

External links 

  
 FC Astana on UEFA.com
 

 
2009 establishments in Kazakhstan
Association football clubs established in 2009
FC
Football clubs in Astana
Football clubs in Kazakhstan